Peters's wrinkle-lipped bat (Mormopterus jugularis), also called Peters's goblin bat, is a species of bat in the family Molossidae, the free-tailed bats. It is endemic to Madagascar, where it is widespread and in some areas abundant. It commonly roosts in human-made structures, sometimes in colonies with other free-tailed bat species. It forages in the open, often in agricultural areas.
The bat is sexually dimorphic, with males larger than females.

Taxonomy and etymology
It was described as a new species in 1865 by German naturalist Wilhelm Peters. Peters placed it in the now-defunct genus Nyctinomus and the subgenus Mormopterus, with the scientific name of Nyctinomus (Mormopterus) jugularis.
In his description of the species (in Latin), Peters wrote that it had "fovea jugulari magna", or a large suprasternal notch. This anatomical feature was likely the inspiration for the species name "jugularis."

Description
Its fur is soft and dense, with its back grayish-brown to charcoal in color, and its belly paler. Its snout has a blunt tip, and is slightly upturned. Its ears are large and rounded; the bases of the ears do not touch. It has a well-defined tragus.

Range and habitat
It is widespread in the western half of Madagascar, as well as along the southern coast.

References

Peters's wrinkle-lipped bat
Bats of Africa
Endemic fauna of Madagascar
Mammals of Madagascar
Peters's wrinkle-lipped bat
Taxa named by Wilhelm Peters